Ritzy is a 1930 comedy play by Sidney Toler and Viva Tattersall. It ran for 32 performances at the Longacre Theatre on Broadway with a cast that included Miriam Hopkins and Ernest Truex. A financially struggling couple living in a cheap hotel believe they have inherited a huge sum of money, until the discovery of closer relatives means they will not receive the fortune.

References

Bibliography
 Allan R. Ellenberger. Miriam Hopkins: Life and Films of a Hollywood Rebel. University Press of Kentucky, 2017.
 Thomas S. Hischak. Broadway Plays and Musicals: Descriptions and Essential Facts of More Than 14,000 Shows through 2007. McFarland, 2009.

1930 plays
Broadway plays
Comedy plays